Pedong is a town in the Pedong CD block in the Kalimpong subdivision of the Kalimpong district in the Indian state of West Bengal. The town is very close to Resi-Sikkim border. Pedong lies on the National Highway-717A  connecting Bagrakote to Gangtok via Pakyong Airport.

Geography

Location

Pedong lies 20 km east of Kalimpong on the way to the Indo-Tibetan border in Sikkim at an altitude of 1,240 metres (4.071 feet). The town, which is located on a ridge, commands a panoramic view of the Kanchenjunga and the Himalayan mountains. The town is divided into two parts, Upper Pedong and Lower Pedong. Pedong lies on the Indo-Tibetan trade route via the Jelepla Pass.

Area overview
The map alongside shows the Kalimpong subdivision, the sole subdivisions of the Kalimpong district. This region is characterized by abruptly rising hills and numerous small streams. It is a predominantly rural area with 77.67% of the population living in rural areas and only 22.23% living in the urban areas. While Kalimpong is the only municipality, Dungra is the sole census town in the entire area. The economy is agro-based and there are 6 tea gardens in the Gorubathan CD block. In 2011, Kalimpong subdivision had a literacy rate of 81.85%, comparable with the highest levels of literacy in the districts of the state. While the first degree college in the subdivision was established at Kalimpong in 1962 the entire subdivision (and now the entire district), other than the head-quarters, had to wait till as late as 2015 (more than half a century) to have their first degree colleges at Pedong and Gorubathan.

Note: The map alongside presents some of the notable locations in the subdivision. All places marked in the map are linked in the larger full screen map.

Important sights
Near Pedong are the ruins of Damsang Gadi, a historical fort built in 1690 AD by the Lepchas. It was at the centre of the long-standing feud with the Dukpas of Bhutan. Later, it was used to ward off the forces of the British East India Company. After the Anglo-Bhutan War of 1864 AD, the fort fell into decay. The Damsang fort (Damsang Gadi) is the only fort in the entire district of Darjeeling. It was home to the last Lepcha King- Gyabo Achuk as the Lepcha people are the real natives of this place.

Another highlight of the town is the Cross Hill, placed by priest Fr. Augustine Desgodins in 1882 AD on his way to Tibet. In the Tibet Mission a lot of Evangelists lost their lives or never came back from Tibet. Fr. Augustine Desgodins in due memory of them erected a cross at a vantage point facing Tibet directly with a hope that someday the evangelists may return. It is considered to have miraculous powers and is a pilgrimage site for the local Christians. The Cross Hill is located at such a point wherein the view of the facing mountains is magnificent. From here one can get a glimpse of Tibet and the People's Republic of Chinese border. It is a perfect sunset point.

Sangchen Dorjee Monastery is one of the oldest monastery in Pedong-Kalimpong region and was built during the Bhutanese rule. This Monastery was established around the early 1700 AD. It provides historical insight into the history and culture of the place. Known as Sangchen Dorjee Gumba also has fresco paintings on the inner walls of the main chamber depicting Tantric Buddhism. Gumpha Dance (Chyaam dance) or the Buddhist Mask dance is also held here annually. It has now become the centre of Shabdrung Rimpoche (known as the Dharma Raja of Bhutan). The last Shabdrung Rimpoche had relocated to Pedong and expired few years ago. His human form has been preserved at Pedong and will be encased in a Stupa/Chorten on an auspicious day. This place has become an important pilgrimage for the Bhutanese and other followers of the Drukpa Khargu tradition of Buddhism.

The villages near Pedong include Sakyong, Kasyong, Dalep, Kagey, Upper Menchu and Lower Menchu.

Demographics
According to the 2011 Census of India, Pedong Khasmahal had a total population of 4,274 of which 2,153 (50%) were males and 2,121 (50%) were females. There were 443 persons in the age range of 0 to 6 years. The total number of literate people in Pedong Khasmahal was 3,131 (81.73% of the population over 6 years).

Major fire incident of 28 January 2015
A major fire broke out at the heart of Pedong on the midnight of 28 January 2015. Around 17 houses were completely gutted by the fire. Fire brigade services from the nearby towns of Kalimpong and Rangpo along with the local people and the Army worked hand in hand to control the situation which could have otherwise razed most of Pedong. The estimated losses summed to multiple Crores, however, no casualties were reported in the unfortunate incident. 
Many locals have glorified the valorous act of two brothers Mr. Lobsang and Dawa Bhutia in the rescue operation, both residents of Pedong. 
Post incident, people from near and distant places visited the town to show solidarity and also to provide help and support in all means possible. Many NGOs have also stood up for the cause.

Education
Government General Degree College, Pedong, was established in 2015. Affiliated with the University of North Bengal it offers honours courses in Nepali, English, history, political science, sociology, chemistry, geology, mathematics and physics, and general courses in arts and science.

St. George's Higher Secondary School is a Christian missionary school and one of the famous boarding school here followed by St Xavier's School, Tender Buds Academy, Grace English School. There are also many nursery schools in this town.

Tourism
Pedong is a popular destination among domestic tourists. However, a good number of foreign tourists also visit Pedong for its various heritage sites having cultural, religious and historical significance. Many budget and mid-range accommodation options are currently available in Pedong.

Transport
As Pedong lies on the National Highway-717A  connecting Bagrakote to Gangtok which is extended by NHIDCL.
Taxis, Jeeps, Buses etc are available from Pedong to cities and towns like Kalimpong, Algarah, Rhenock, Labha, Rongli, Gorubathan, Siliguri etc.

Pakyong Airport is 50 kilometres away from the town, and Bagdogra International Airport is 99 kilometres away. The nearest railway station is Malbazar Junction.

Flora and fauna
Pedong is rich in avifauna. Various species of Himalayan and lowland birds can be seen around Pedong.

Healthcare
Pedong Rural Hospital, with 30 beds, is the major government medical facility in the Kalimpong II CD block. There are primary health centres at Gitdubling (with 6 beds) and Algarah (with 2 beds).

Infrastructure
Pedong is well connected with roads as the only medium of transport in Hills. Power and mobile network outage is almost common every day. A very poor connectivity when compared to other small towns. Only few network providers are available mainly Airtel, Vi & BSNL. Scarcity of drinking water can be experienced in summer as usual in Darjeeling & Kalimpong.

References

External links
Unofficial information guide website of Pedong
Pedong Travel Guide North Bengal Tourism

Villages in Kalimpong district
Hill stations in West Bengal